Justice Blake may refer to:

Bruce Blake (judge) (1881–1957), associate justice of the Washington Supreme Court
Henry N. Blake (1838–1935), associate justice of the Montana Supreme Court